This article lists political parties in Canada.

Federal parties

In contrast with the political party systems of many nations, Canadian parties at the federal level are often only loosely connected with parties at the provincial level, despite having similar names. One exception is the New Democratic Party. The NDP is organizationally integrated, with most of its provincial counterparts including a shared membership.

Provincial and territorial parties

Alberta

British Columbia

Manitoba

New Brunswick

Newfoundland and Labrador

Northwest Territories
From approximately 1897 to 1905, political parties were active; however, legislative government was eliminated when the provinces of Alberta and Saskatchewan were created out of the heavily populated area of NWT. Elected legislative government was re-established in 1951. Like Nunavut, NWT elects independent candidates and operates by consensus.  Some candidates in recent years have asserted that they were running on behalf of a party, but territorial law does not recognize parties.

Historical parties 1897–1905
Northwest Territories Liberal Party
Northwest Territories Liberal-Conservative Party

Nova Scotia

Nunavut
The territory, established in 1999, has a legislature that runs on a consensus government model, candidates running as independents, and no parties are represented in the Legislative Assembly.

Ontario

Prince Edward Island

Quebec

Saskatchewan

Yukon

Municipal parties
The majority of municipal politics in Canada are non-partisan, but the municipal governments of Vancouver and Montreal operate on a party system.

Burnaby 

 Burnaby Citizens Association - 4
 Burnaby Green Party - 1

There are four independents.

Montreal

Surrey 
 Safe Surrey Coalition - 5
 Surrey First - 4

Vancouver

Canada
Political party